The 1948 United States presidential election in South Dakota took place on November 2, 1948, as part of the 1948 United States presidential election. Voters chose four representatives, or electors, to the Electoral College, who voted for president and vice president.

South Dakota was won by Governor Thomas Dewey (R–New York), running with Governor Earl Warren, with 51.84% of the popular vote, against incumbent President Harry S. Truman (D–Missouri), running with Senator Alben W. Barkley, with 47.04% of the popular vote.

Results

Results by county

See also
 United States presidential elections in South Dakota

References

South Dakota
1948
1948 South Dakota elections